Protestant Women in Germany (Evangelische Frauen in Deutschland or EFiD) is an ecumenical umbrella group of 40 German Protestant (evangelical) women's organizations. Its headquarters is in Hanover, and it was founded in 2008. It represents about three million German women.

References

External links 
Official website

Protestant ecumenism
Christian organizations established in 2008